Rechta (Arabic: رشتة) is a dish made from pasta cut into thin fresh artisan strips, typical of (Algeria). It is in particular the symbolic dish of Algiers cuisine.

Etymology 
The word comes from the Persian rista, meaning "thread" and commonly used to refer to pasta.

The word rechta is berberized to tarechta, still commonly used in Oran and Tlemcen in Algeria, the word comes from the root rkt or rcht.

Variants

Algeria 
Rechta is a popular pasta dish in Algeria, and is particularly beloved in the cities of Algiers and Constantine, where it is considered a specialty.

In Algiers, rechta is typically served with a meat and vegetable sauce that is seasoned with a variety of spices. The sauce is often quite spicy and may contain chickpeas, potatoes, and other vegetables. Some versions of the dish include a roux made from flour and oil, which is used to thicken the sauce and give it a smooth texture. The pasta itself is typically made from a combination of semolina flour and water, and is rolled out into long, flat noodles that are cut into strips.

In Constantine, rechta is often served with a tomato-based sauce that includes a variety of vegetables, such as onions, carrots, and green peppers. The sauce may also contain meat or poultry, such as chicken or lamb, and is typically flavored with herbs like parsley and cilantro. Some versions of the dish may also include chickpeas or other legumes. The pasta used in Constantine is similar to that used in Algiers, and is also made from semolina flour and water. 

In both cities, rechta is considered a festive dish that is often served at special occasions like weddings and religious holidays.

Tunisia 

In Tunisia, rechta is also consumed in Bizerte, but it is typically served in a soup or stew. The pasta is often prepared in a similar way to Algerian rechta, but it is cut into shorter lengths and may be a bit wider. particularly rechta jerya or rechta njara.

References 

Algerian cuisine
African cuisine
Maghrebi cuisine